Jaedon Descheneau (born 22 February 1995) is a Canadian born ice hockey player. He currently plays in the Finnish Liiga for team SaiPa. He was born is Leduc, Canada. His youth team is Leduc MHA.

References 

1995 births
Living people
SaiPa players